The Gordon–Van Tine Company Historic District, also known as the U.N. Roberts and Company Buildings, is a nationally recognized historic district located east of downtown Davenport, Iowa, United States. It was listed on the National Register of Historic Places in 2017. The Gordon–Van Tine Company manufactured pre-cut, mail-order homes in this facility, beginning around 1916.

The company was incorporated as a subsidiary of the U.N. Roberts lumber company in 1907. They began by selling construction materials to builders, but by 1910 they offered house plans and became one of the first companies in the United States to offer fully pre-cut houses. The customer could choose from a variety of floor plans, finishes, design features, and equipment choices. The lumber for the houses came from company mills in Davenport, Iowa; Chehalis, Washington; St. Louis, Missouri; and from one of two southern lumber yards, first in Louisiana, and then in Hattiesburg, Mississippi.

The company sold an estimated 54,000 homes under the Gordon–Van Tine name, and provided the lumber for another 20,000 to Montgomery Ward company, who contracted with Gordon-Van Tine to supply materials for their identical line of Wardway homes, beginning in 1917. While better known for their houses, Gordon-Van Tine also provided the plans and materials for pre-cut barns and other farm structures. Gordon-Van Tine remained in operation until 1946, when it was sold to a Cincinnati salvage firm that liquidated it just as the post–World War II housing boom was beginning.

Two of the buildings in the historic district have been transformed into an apartment complex. The four-story brick office building is the more ornate of the two. The factory was located in a five-story brick building next door. The office building houses 15 apartments, and the production facility houses 98. Commercial retail space was also created in the facility. Revitalization efforts for the $35 million project were begun in 2000 and completed in the summer of 2019.

Gordon-Van Tine in St. Louis, Missouri 

The Gordon-Van Tine company advertised that one of their major lumberyards was in St. Louis, Missouri. According to articles in old Lumberman journals and newsletters, that lumber yard did not use the Gordon-Van Tine moniker, but rather operated, first, under the name Funck Lumber. A 1915 issue of Mississippi Valley Lumberman newsletter references the use of the Funk (sic) Lumber yard by Gordon-Van Tine, and the January 18, 1919 issue of The Southern Lumberman , discussing the retirement of George W. Funck, discusses the ownership of the Funck Lumberyard by Davenport's U.N. Roberts lumber company (parent company to Gordon-Van Tine). Gordon-Van Tine offered its first "Ready-Cut" catalog in 1916, and that year coincides with the year that the St. Louis Funck Lumber Company re-tooled their business to add a wood-working plant for the manufacture of "ready cut" houses, as mentioned in the March 13, 1916 Iron Age  lumberman journal. According to the above-referenced 1919 newsletter article about the retirement of president George W. Funck, that lumber yard was re-named Goodfellow Lumber , upon Funck's retirement. The Funck / Goodfellow Lumberyard was located near the corner of Goodfellow and Natural Bridge Roads, at 5700 Natural Bridge Road, in the city of St. Louis, in what is now the 63120 zip code. St. Louis City directories and St. Louis newspapers of the era, include advertisements for the company, giving this location. The addition of the "ready-cut" manufacturing section of the lumberyard was a boon for business at Funck Lumberyard, which saw its business revenues triple in 1918 and 1919, according to a January 1920 Southern Lumberman journal article that mentions the change of the company's name to Goodfellow Lumber.

References

External links

Gordon-Van Tine Catalogs Online

Houses
 1907 Gordon, Van Tine and Company's Book of Plans for Everyone - Plans and specifications only
 1913 Gordon-Van Tine Book of Building Plans - Plans; materials sold separately (not ready cut)
 1916 Gordon-Van Tine's Standard Homes (not ready cut)
 1916 Gordon-Van Tine's Ready-Cut Homes
 1916 Gordon-Van Tine Company's Ready-cut Summer Cottages
 1919 Gordon-Van Tine Ready-Cut homes (listed incorrectly as 1918)
 1920 Gordon-Van Tine Homes
 1921 Gordon-Van Tine Homes 4e
 1921 Gordon-Van Tine Homes 8e (listed incorrectly as 1920)
 1926 Gordon-Van Tine Homes (on Archive)
 1926 Gordon-Van Tine Homes (on Flickr )
 1927 Gordon-Van Tine Homes Plan-cut homes
 1929 (?) World's Greatest Sale of Homes
 1929 Gordon-Van Tine Plan-Cut Homes—house models
 1929 Gordon-Van Tine—Interiors and supplies
 1931 Gordon-Van Tine Plan-Cut Homes
 1936 Book of Homes Gordon-Van Tine Company
 1936 Gordon-Van Tine Economy Homes
 1941 Book of Homes Gordon-Van Tine Co.

Other structures
 (no date) Gordon-Van Tine Ready-Cut Garages
 1918 Barns--Photographs and Letters, Gordon-Van Tine Co.

Building materials
 1918 Building Material Gordon-Van Tine Co.
 1923 Building Material Sale Spring 1923 Gordon-Van Tine Co.
 1931 Building Material Gordon-Van Co.
 1938 Building Materials Gordon-Van Tine Co.

Historic districts in Davenport, Iowa
Industrial buildings and structures on the National Register of Historic Places in Iowa
National Register of Historic Places in Davenport, Iowa
Historic districts on the National Register of Historic Places in Iowa
Manufactured home manufacturers
+